The Hermitage is a cottage orné in Hanwell, London built by rector George Glasse in 1809 on the site of a previous house called the Elms. Nikolaus Pevsner described the house as "a peach of an early c19 Gothic thatched cottage with two pointed windows, a quatrefoil, and an ogee arched door, all on a minute scale. Inside, an octagonal hall and reception room." It is Grade II listed building on Historic England's National Heritage List.

Behind the cottage lies a spring, which may be the origin of 'well' being incorporated into the local place name of Hanwell. There is also a small lake and a barn. The barn was used in the mid-1960s by Pictorial Charts Educational Trust, for housing and shipping wall charts used by schools all over the country.

References

Grade II listed houses in London
Grade II listed buildings in the London Borough of Ealing
Houses in the London Borough of Ealing
Cottage orné
Houses completed in 1809
Hanwell